National Congress of Trade Unions is a central trade union federation in the Bahamas. It was founded by Dr. Leroy "Duke" Hanna on 10 November 1995.

See also

 List of trade unions
 List of federations of trade unions

References

External links
Home page

Trade unions in the Bahamas
Bahamas
Trade unions established in 1995